Back to the World is the third studio album by R&B singer Tevin Campbell. It was released by Qwest Records on June 18, 1996.

Critical reception

Allmusic editor Leo Stanleyndi found that Back to the World "is proof positive that the teen idol is now a man [...] For the most part, he succeeds in establishing himself as a vocalist of prodigious talents and significant worth [..] No matter how Campbell tries to phase out that sweetness on Back to the World, he retains that appealing quality, which makes the album all the more endearing." Billboards Paul Verna found that the song selection on Back to the World "suggests a more adult approach, despite several hip-hop tracks that give the mostly mellow set a trendy bounce. Credit is due to label's commitment to artist delevopment which is readily apparent on the project because of the performer's stronger delivery and continually evolving sound."

Vibe editor David Mills felt that with the album Campbell "maintains versatility, and also seems a lot more comfortable singing in his gutsier, sly-sounding lower register [...] This album is a robust statement about Tevin's vocal transformation, a shrewd departure from his first two [...] Back to the World isn't the yummy teen fluff I'm Ready was. Nor is it the delightful baby candy of his debut. This album is about growing up, its underlying vocal theme a bold quest for maturity." Carl Allen from The Buffalo News found that "sounding just short of adulthood is what makes Campbell's work so outstanding [...] This first compact disc since his stirring debut about three years ago is bound to again put him in contention with some of the big boys of popular music. He has the ability to enclose lyrics in a suspended tonal reality that has clarity as its major feature. The result is romantic music that can be understood immediately. Pretty effective stuff taken track by track. A little tedious all at once, except for true fans."

Commercial performance
Back to the World was a commercial disappointment compared to his first two albums T.E.V.I.N. and I'm Ready. Three singles were released off the album: "Back to the World", "I Got It Bad" and "Could You Learn to Love".

Track listing

Charts

References

External links
 

1996 albums
Tevin Campbell albums
Qwest Records albums